Gardermoen may refer to:
 Gardermoen, Norway
 Oslo Airport
 Gardermoen Air Station
 Gardermoen Line
 Gardermoen Station
 Norwegian Armed Forces Aircraft Collection at Gardermoen